Armenia is scheduled to compete at the 2017 World Aquatics Championships in Budapest, Hungary from 14 to 30 July.

Diving

Armenia has entered 3 divers (three male).

Swimming

Armenia has received a Universality invitation from FINA to send a maximum of four swimmers (two men and two women) to the World Championships.

References

Nations at the 2017 World Aquatics Championships
2017 in Armenian sport
Armenia at the World Aquatics Championships